Randolph Street Historic District is a national historic district located at Thomasville, Davidson County, North Carolina. The district encompasses 10 contributing buildings in mixed-use area in the city of Thomasville.  The contributing buildings include three residences, the Memorial Methodist Church (1951), the Standard Chair Company Building (c. 1926), the Gray Concrete Pipe Company Machine Shop (c. 1923, c. 1935, c. 1957), and the Carolina and Yadkin Valley Railroad Depot (1913).

It was added to the National Register of Historic Places in 2012.

References

Historic districts on the National Register of Historic Places in North Carolina
Buildings and structures in Davidson County, North Carolina
National Register of Historic Places in Davidson County, North Carolina
Thomasville, North Carolina